The Co-Cathedral of St. Joseph of the Roman Catholic Diocese of Brooklyn, located at 856 Pacific Street between Vanderbilt and Underhill Avenues in the Prospect Heights neighborhood of Brooklyn in New York City, was built in 1912 in the Spanish Colonial style, replacing a previous church built in 1861. The parish was founded in 1850 to serve the large immigrant population that was moving into the city of Brooklyn at the time.

On February 14, 2013, Pope Benedict XVI approved the petition of Bishop Nicholas Anthony DiMarzio to have the church designated as the diocesan co-cathedral because the Cathedral Basilica of St. James is too small to hold diocesan liturgies, and because of its prime location near the newly opened Barclays Center and a construction boom that was to include 16,000 new apartments in the area. The church can hold 1,500 worshippers, and as of 2014 averaged 700 at Sunday mass, up from only a few dozen 10 years earlier. The building underwent an $18.5 million renovation.

The church's campus also includes a Gothic revival rectory next door at 834 Pacific Street, built around 1860, and a school at 683 Dean Street, built around 1920, which is now used as a senior center.

See also
List of Catholic cathedrals in the United States
List of cathedrals in the United States
List of cathedrals in New York

References

External links
 Official Co-Cathedral Site
 Roman Catholic Diocese of Brooklyn Official Site

Joseph, Co-cathedral of St.
Joseph, Co-cathedral of St.
Prospect Heights, Brooklyn
Neoclassical architecture in New York City
Religious organizations established in 1850
Roman Catholic churches completed in 1861
19th-century Roman Catholic church buildings in the United States
1850 establishments in New York (state)
Cathedrals in New York City
Neoclassical church buildings in the United States